The 1912 Southern Intercollegiate Athletic Association football season was the college football games played by the member schools of the Southern Intercollegiate Athletic Association as part of the 1912 college football season. The season began on September 28.

Ole Miss was suspended at year's end.

Conference champion Vanderbilt suffered its only loss to national champion Harvard. The 1912 season saw the NCAA implement several rule changes to increase scoring. These included: the number of downs allowed to advance the ball at least 10 yards was increased from three to four, the value of a touchdown increased from 5 points to 6, the length of the field was reduced to 100 yards, 10-yard end zones were added, the onside kick was eliminated, and unlimited use of the forward pass was introduced.

Regular season

SIAA teams in bold.

Week One

Week Two

Week Three

Week Four

Week Five

Week Six

Week Seven

Week Eight

Week Nine

Week Ten

Week Twelve

Week Thirteen

Week Fourteen

Bowl games

Awards and honors

All-Americans

HB - Lew Hardage, Vanderbilt (WC-3)

All-Southern team

The composite All-Southern team formed by "consolidated pick" of ten sporting writers culled by the Atlanta Constitution editor Dick Jemison included:

References